Bullia mauritiana, the Mauritius bullia, is a species of sea snail, a marine gastropod mollusk in the family Nassariidae, the Nassa mud snails or dog whelks.

Description
The shell size varies between 30 mm and 75 mm

Distribution
This species is distributed in the Indian Ocean along Madagascar and South Africa

References

 Dautzenberg, Ph. (1929). Mollusques testacés marins de Madagascar. Faune des Colonies Francaises, Tome III

External links
 

Nassariidae
Gastropods described in 1839
Taxa named by John Edward Gray